James Wayne Lecture (October 29, 1924 — December 19, 1999) was an American football guard who played for one season in the All-America Football Conference (AAFC) for the Buffalo Bisons. After playing college football for Washington University and Northwestern, he was drafted in the eighth round of the 1946 NFL Draft by the Philadelphia Eagles. He played for the Bisons in 1946.

References

1924 births
1999 deaths
Players of American football from Chicago
American football guards
Washington University Bears football players
Northwestern Wildcats football players
Buffalo Bisons (AAFC) players